Neoniphon sammara, the sammara squirrelfish, also known as the blood-spot squirrelfish, slender squirrelfish, spotfin squirrelfish, armed squirrel-fish or javelin squirrelfish, is a species squirrelfish found in the Indian Ocean and Pacific Ocean from East Africa to the Hawaiian Islands. It feeds on shrimps and small crabs and fish at night and can grow up to  TL in length, though its common length is only  TL. Like N. opercularis, it has a venomous spine on its preopercle.

Habitat
N. sammara lives alone or in small groups on seagrass beds and hard substrates in reef flats and lagoons. Of its genus, it is the most likely to be found in shallow waters and it is often associated with Acropora corals, which it will use as shelter during the day.

Commercial use
N. sammara is not a commonly-eaten fish, but is common in the Indian aquarium trade. It can also be used as bait for tuna fisheries.

References

External links
 Fishes of Australia : Neoniphon sammara
 

sammara squirrelfish
Marine fish of Northern Australia
sammara squirrelfish
Taxa named by Peter Forsskål